WRMS (790 AM) is a radio station licensed to Beardstown, Illinois, United States.  The station is currently owned by Covenant Network.

References

External links

RMS